Gabriel and the Mountain is a 2017 Brazilian-French drama film directed by Fellipe Gamarano Barbosa. It tells the true story of Brazilian backpacker Gabriel Buchmann who travels through several African countries, for some time with his girlfriend Cristina, and finally dies while climbing Mount Mulanje in Malawi. It was screened in the International Critics' Week section at the 2017 Cannes Film Festival. At Cannes, it won the France 4 Visionary Award and the Gan Foundation Support for Distribution Award.

Cast
 Caroline Abras as Cristina
 João Pedro Zappa as Gabriel
 Luke Mpata
 John Goodluck
 Rashidi Athuman
 Leonard Siampala
 Rhosinah Sekeleti
 Alex Alembe

Reception
On review aggregator website Rotten Tomatoes, the film holds an approval rating of 83%, based on 18 reviews, and an average rating of 6.5/10. On Metacritic, the film has a weighted average score of 69 out of 100, based on 9 critics, indicating "generally favorable reviews".

References

External links
 

2017 films
2017 drama films
2010s Portuguese-language films
Brazilian drama films
French drama films
2010s French films